Iko is a Lower Cross River language of Nigeria. Speakers are ethnically, though not linguistically, Obolo.

References

Lower Cross River languages
Languages of Nigeria